Hashemabad (also Romanized as Hāshemābād) is a village in Robat Rural District, in the Central District of Sabzevar County, Razavi Khorasan Province, Iran. At the 2006 census, its population was 525, in 161 families.

References 

Populated places in Sabzevar County